General Hudson may refer to:

Havelock Hudson (1862–1944), British Indian Army general
John L. Hudson (fl. 1970s–2010s), U.S. Air Force lieutenant general
Lewis C. Hudson (1910–2001), U.S. Marine Corps brigadier general
Peter Hudson (British Army officer) (1923–2000), British Army lieutenant general